Friendship, Brotherhood and Cooperation Congress of Turkish States and Communities is a series of congresses held in various cities, yearly or every two years, trying to create and improve ties between various Turkic nations and communities. The meetings are organized by the "Turkish-Speaking States and Communities Friendship, Brotherhood and Cooperation Foundation" (TUDEV) since 1993.

The first Congress was held on March 21, 1993. The first ten congresses were all held in Turkey. At the 10th Congress in Antalya between 18 and 20 September 2006, nearly 800 delegates from over 30 countries. The 11th Congress was held in Baku, Azerbaijan in November 2007.

Ethnic Turkish people